Souletin or Zuberoan is the Basque dialect spoken in Soule, France. Souletin is marked by influences from Occitan (in particular the  Béarnese dialect), especially in the lexicon. Another distinct characteristic is the use of  verb forms, a form of address including in third person verbs the interlocutor marker embedded in the auxiliary verb:  →  (s/he came → s/he came to you).

Name
In English sources, the Basque-based term Zuberoan is sometimes encountered.

Distribution
The southern dialect Roncalese was sometimes included within Zuberoan. A Basque language variety close to Zuberoan may have extended more to the east, into the Central Pyrenees, as attested by placenames and historical records about the Basque peoples ( in the Royal Frankish Annals).

Phonology

In addition to the five vowels present in all other Basque dialects, Zuberoan also has a close front rounded vowel  (written ), which is markedly noticeable to speakers of other varieties. All six vowels can be nasalized ( is absent in some Souletin varieties), with nasalization being phonemic. It is likely that the sixth vowel arose influenced by the Béarnese vowel shift some centuries ago instead of being an ancient vowel lost in other dialects of Basque.

Souletin features the voiceless aspirated stops , which contrast with their unaspirated counterparts. The alveolar tap  present in other dialects has been lost in Souletin. The voiced fricatives  are found almost exclusively in loanwords, they are present in other varieties only as allophones of their unvoiced counterparts. The voiceless nasal glottal approximant  is found exclusively in intervocalic position, and triggers the nasalization of the adjoining vowels.

Example 
This example of the "Orreaga" ballad composed by Arturo Campion shows some differences between this dialect and the standard Basque (Euskara batua).

See also
Basque dialects

Notes

References

Citations

Sources 

 

Basque dialects
Soule